Cesano may refer to:

 Cesano Boscone, a comune (municipality) in the province of Milan, northern Italy
 Cesano Maderno, a comune in the province of Milan, northern Italy
 Cesano (RM), a frazione of the comune of Rome, Italy
 Cesano, a frazione of the comune of Senigallia, Marche, Italy
 Cesano (river), in the Italian Marche